Unvanquished is a free and open-source video game. It is a multiplayer first-person shooter and real-time strategy game where Humans and Aliens fight for domination.

Gameplay 

Players fight in an alien or human team with respective melee and conventional ballistic weaponry. The aim of the game is to destroy the enemy team and the structures that keep them alive, as well as ensure one's own team's bases and expansions are maintained. Players earn resources for themselves and their team via aggression.

Commenting on gameplay, Lifewire noted: "One particularly fun aspect of Unvanquished is that as insects, players can crawl on the walls and ceilings, adding a new, though perhaps somewhat disorienting, take on game physics".

Development 
Unvanquished is a spiritual successor to Tremulous. The gameplay and game resources are under the CC BY-SA 2.5 Creative Commons license whilst the Daemon engine is under the GPLv3.

Development began the summer of 2011 on SourceForge, with the first alpha version being released on February 29, 2012. The game moved to Github in 2015.

Unvanquished is developed by a team of volunteers who used to release a new Alpha on the first Sunday of every month.

However, since the project reached a new stage of development, betas are released with less frequency.

Engine 

The daemon engine is a fork of the earlier version of the OpenWolf Engine. While developing "their" engine, Unvanquished team uploaded clean copy of the source code, dropped original commit history and claimed project as theirs. Its development is now proceeding in its own path from its predecessors.

In 2015, with version 0.42, the Unvanquished developers managed to separate the game's engine code from the game's code by teaming up with developers of Xonotic.

Reception 
Michael Larabel from Phoronix.com praised Unvanquished's graphics in July 2012, while it was still in alpha state. Lifewire praised the insect mechanic as an interesting twist and the ease of modding (referring to the level editor).

Softpedia reviewed the game in version 0.49 in March 2016 and gave 3.5 stars.

Between 2011 and June 2017 the game was downloaded alone from SourceForge over 1.3 million times.

See also
 List of open-source first-person shooters
 List of open-source video games
 Linux gaming

References

External links 
 
 Source code repository on GitHub
 Original project repository on SourceForge.net
 Project wiki

2012 video games
First-person shooters
Linux games
Windows games
MacOS games
Shooter video games
Strategy video games
Multiplayer online games
First-person strategy video games
Open-source video games
Creative Commons-licensed video games
Video games about insects